Oratosquilla is a genus of crustaceans belonging to the family Squillidae. The species of this genus are found in Indo-West-Pacific. The genus was first described in 1968 by Raymond Brendan Manning.

Species
The following species are recognized.

References

Stomatopoda
Malacostraca genera
Taxa named by Raymond B. Manning